The Katanga masked weaver (Ploceus katangae) is a species of bird in the family Ploceidae.
It is found in south-eastern Democratic Republic of the Congo and northern Zambia.

References

External links
 Katanga masked weaver -  Species text in Weaver Watch.

Katanga masked weaver
Birds of Central Africa
Katanga masked weaver
Taxonomy articles created by Polbot